Nikola Juričić (born 5 August 1970) is a retired Bosnia and Herzegovina football striker. His son is fellow football player Luka Juričić.

Club career
He spent most of his career in Croatia and Bosnia-Herzegovina, but also had a spell in Germany.

References

1970 births
Living people
People from Čitluk, Bosnia and Herzegovina
Association football forwards
Yugoslav footballers
Bosnia and Herzegovina footballers
FK Velež Mostar players
NK Osijek players
NK Varaždin players
NK Neretva players
NK GOŠK Dubrovnik players
SpVgg Greuther Fürth players
NK Brotnjo players
NK Široki Brijeg players
Croatian Football League players
Regionalliga players
Premier League of Bosnia and Herzegovina players
Bosnia and Herzegovina expatriate footballers
Expatriate footballers in Croatia
Bosnia and Herzegovina expatriate sportspeople in Croatia
Expatriate footballers in Germany
Bosnia and Herzegovina expatriate sportspeople in Germany
Bosnia and Herzegovina football managers
NK Brotnjo managers